The 1978 New Orleans Saints season was the Saints’ twelfth season. Quarterback Archie Manning put together one of his finest seasons, earning the NFC Player of the Year award and becoming the Saints’ first Pro Bowl representative since the NFL–AFL merger as the Saints finished with a franchise-best 7–9 mark under new head coach Dick Nolan. Seven of the Saints’ losses came against teams that qualified for the playoffs (including both Super Bowl XIII teams, the Pittsburgh Steelers and the Dallas Cowboys), whilst all nine losses came against teams who finished at or above .500.

Offseason 
 On August 5, the NFL played its first game in Mexico City. The Saints beat the Philadelphia Eagles by a score of 14–7.

NFL draft

Personnel

Staff

Roster

Regular season

Schedule

Standings

References

External links 
 1978 New Orleans Saints at Pro-Football-Reference.com

New Orleans Saints
New Orleans Saints seasons
New Orl